The Yemenite ambassador in Washington, D.C. is the official representative of the Government in Aden to the Government of the United States. They work at the Embassy of Yemen, Washington, D.C.

List of ambassadors

See also
Yemen–United States relations

References

 
United States
Yemen